Meena is a documentary film about sex trafficking in India that premiered on June 26, 2014 in New York City. This film marks the directorial debut of Lucy Liu, Colin K. Gray, and Megan Raney.

Premise
The film is based on the true story Meena Khatun, a girl from India, who was forced into sex slavery since age 11. In the film, the character is titled Meena Hasina and is shown to be of age 8 instead of the original 11.

Cast
Tannishtha Chatterjee as Meena Hasina
Sparsh Khanchandani as young Meena Hasina
Himani Shivpuri as Ainul Bibi
Vikas Shrivastav as Manooj
Prerna Punjabi as Naina
Almaas as Kamala

Production
Filming began in Mumbai, India in 2010 and is based on the first chapter of Half the Sky by Nicholas Kristof and Sheryl WuDunn.

References

External links
 Meena at IMDb
 Meena the Movie official website

American documentary films
American crime films
Documentary films about organized crime
Films about pedophilia
Documentary films about child abuse
2010s crime films
2014 documentary films
Documentary films about slavery
Documentary films about prostitution in India
Works about sex trafficking
Forced prostitution
Films about child prostitution
Documentary films about poverty
2014 films
2010s Hindi-language films
Women in India
2010s English-language films
2010s American films